Al Seagraves (born April 14, 1953) is an American football coach.  He served as the head football coach at Elon University from 1996 until 2003, compiling a record of 40–49.

Head coaching record

References

External links
 Shippensburg Hall of Fame profile

1953 births
Living people
American football fullbacks
American football halfbacks
American football linebackers
Army Black Knights football coaches
Elon Phoenix football coaches
Shippensburg Red Raiders football coaches
Shippensburg Red Raiders football players
The Citadel Bulldogs football coaches
UCF Knights football coaches
People from Delaware County, Pennsylvania
Players of American football from Pennsylvania